Mina Hesselberg (born 20 April 2000) is a Norwegian handball player for Vipers Kristiansand.

She is also a part of Norway's national recruit team in handball.

Hesselberg started her career as a back, but retrained as a wing in 2021.

Achievements
EHF Champions League:
Winner: 2021/2022
Norwegian League:
Winner: 2021/2022
Norwegian Cup:
Winner: 2022/23

References
 

2000 births
Living people
Norwegian female handball players
21st-century Norwegian women